The 1982 Milwaukee Brewers season was the 13th season for the franchise. The team finished with the best record in MLB (95–67) and won their first and only American League Championship.

As a team, the Brewers led Major League Baseball in a number of offensive categories, including at bats (5733), runs scored (891), home runs (216), runs batted in (843), slugging percentage (.455), on-base plus slugging (.789), total bases (2606) and extra-base hits (534).

Offseason 
October 23, 1981: Rickey Keeton was traded by the Brewers to the Houston Astros for Pete Ladd.
January 12, 1982: Tom Pagnozzi was drafted by the Milwaukee Brewers in the 24th round of the 1982 amateur draft, but did not sign.
February 26, 1982: John Flinn was released by the Brewers.

Regular season 
 August 27, 1982: Against the Brewers, Rickey Henderson broke Lou Brock's record for most stolen bases in one season. Doc Medich was on the mound when Henderson broke the record.
 September 24, 1982: Robin Yount had 6 RBIs in a game against the Baltimore Orioles.
 Paul Molitor's 136 runs not only led the American League, but they were the most scored in the league since 1949.
 Robin Yount became the first shortstop in American League history to lead the league in slugging percentage. He would go on to lead the league in hits, doubles, and total bases as he was voted the American League Most Valuable Player.

Season standings 
The Brewers traveled to Baltimore needing to just win one game out of a four-game finale against the Orioles.  The Brewers dropped the first three.  They then won the last regular season game of the year in what was essentially a one-game playoff against the Orioles.

Record vs. opponents

Notable transactions 
May 14, 1982: Rob Picciolo was traded by the Oakland Athletics to the Milwaukee Brewers for Mike Warren and John Evans (minors).
June 7, 1982: Dale Sveum was drafted by the Milwaukee Brewers in the 1st round (25th pick) of the 1982 amateur draft. Player signed June 14, 1982.
August 30, 1982: The Brewers traded players to be named later and cash to the Houston Astros for Don Sutton. The Brewers completed the trade by sending Kevin Bass, Frank DiPino, and Mike Madden to the Astros on September 3.

Roster

Game log

Regular season

|-style=background:#bbb
|–|| April 6 || || Indians || colspan="7" | Postponed (Cold) (Makeup date: September 2) 
|-style=background:#bbb
|–|| April 8 || || Indians || colspan="7" | Postponed (Snow) (Makeup date: September 2)
|-style=background:#bbb
|–|| April 20 || || Blue Jays || colspan="7" | Postponed (Cold) (Makeup date: August 12)
|-

|-

|-

|-style=background:#bbb
|–|| July 6 || || @ White Sox || colspan="7" | Postponed (Rain; Site change) (Makeup date: July 15)
|-

|-

|-

|-

|- style="text-align:center;"
| Legend:       = Win       = Loss       = PostponementBold = Brewers team member

Postseason Game log

|-style=background:#fcc
| 1 || October 5 || 7:25 p.m. CDT || @ Angels || 3–8 || John (1–0) || Caldwell (0–1) || – || 64,406 || 0–1 || L1
|-style=background:#fcc
| 2 || October 6 || 7:15 p.m. CDT || @ Angels || 2–4 || Kison (1–0) || Vuckovich (0–1) || – || 64,179 || 0–2 || L2
|-style=background:#cfc
| 3 || October 8 || 2:15 p.m. CDT || Angels || 5–3 || Sutton (1–0) || Zahn (0–1) || Ladd (1) || 50,135 || 1–2 || W1
|-style=background:#cfc
| 4 || October 9 || 12 Noon CDT || Angels || 9–5 || Haas (1–0) || John (1–1) || Slaton (1) || 51,003 || 2–2 || W2
|-style=background:#cfc
| 5 || October 10 || 3:20 p.m. CDT || Angels || 4–3 || McClure (1–0) || Sánchez (0–1) || Ladd (2) || 54,968 || 3–2 || W3
|-

|-style=background:#cfc
| 1 || October 12 || 7:30 p.m. CDT || @ Cardinals || 10–0 || Caldwell (1–0) || Forsch (0–1) || – || 53,723 || 1–0 || W1
|-style=background:#fcc
| 2 || October 13 || 7:20 p.m. CDT || @ Cardinals || 4–5 || Sutter (1–0) || McClure (0–1) || – || 53,723 || 1–1 || L1
|-style=background:#fcc
| 3 || October 15 || 7:30 p.m. CDT || Cardinals || 2–6 || Andújar (1–0) || Vuckovich (0–1) || Sutter (1) || 56,556 || 1–2 || L2
|-style=background:#cfc
| 4 || October 16 || 12:20 p.m. CDT || Cardinals || 7–5 || Slaton (1–0) || Bair (0–1) || McClure (1) || 56,560 || 2–2 || W1
|-style=background:#cfc
| 5 || October 17 || 3:45 p.m. CDT || Cardinals || 6–4 || Caldwell (2–0) || Forsch (0–2) || McClure (2) || 56,562 || 3–2 || W2
|-style=background:#fcc
| 6 || October 19 || 7:20 p.m. CDT || @ Cardinals || 1–13 || Stuper (1–0) || Sutton (0–1) || – || 53,723 || 3–3 || L1
|-style=background:#fcc
| 7 || October 20 || 7:20 p.m. CDT || @ Cardinals || 3–6 || Andújar (2–0) || McClure (0–2) || Sutter (2) || 53,723 || 3–4 || L2
|-

|- style="text-align:center;"
| Legend:       = Win       = Loss       = PostponementBold = Brewers team member

Player stats

Batting

Starters by position 
Note: Pos = Position; G = Games played; AB = At bats; H = Hits; Avg. = Batting average; HR = Home runs; RBI = Runs batted in

Other batters 
Note: G = Games played; AB = At bats; H = Hits; Avg. = Batting average; HR = Home runs; RBI = Runs batted in

Pitching

Starting pitchers 
Note: G = Games pitched; IP = Innings pitched; W = Wins; L = Losses; ERA = Earned run average; SO = Strikeouts

Other pitchers 
Note: G = Games pitched; IP = Innings pitched; W = Wins; L = Losses; ERA = Earned run average; SO = Strikeouts

Relief pitchers 
Note: G = Games pitched; W = Wins; L = Losses; SV = Saves; ERA = Earned run average; SO = Strikeouts

Postseason

ALCS

Game 1, October 5 
Anaheim Stadium, Anaheim, California

Game 2, October 6 
Anaheim Stadium, Anaheim, California

Game 3, October 8 
Milwaukee County Stadium, Milwaukee, Wisconsin

Game 4, October 9 
Milwaukee County Stadium, Milwaukee, Wisconsin

Game 5, October 10 
Milwaukee County Stadium, Milwaukee, Wisconsin

Game 5 proved to be the most dramatic of the series. The Angels got a quick 1-0 lead in the first on a double by Brian Downing and a single by Fred Lynn. But Milwaukee tied the game in the bottom of the inning when Paul Molitor doubled and eventually came home on a sacrifice fly by Ted Simmons. The Angels made it 2-1 in the third on an RBI single from Fred Lynn, and stretched the lead to 3-1 in the fourth on a run-scoring single from Bob Boone. Milwaukee cut the lead to 3-2 in the bottom of the fourth on Ben Oglivie's homer. The score remained unchanged until the bottom of the seventh, when disaster struck the Angels. Milwaukee loaded the bases on two singles and a walk. Cecil Cooper then cracked the series-winning hit, a two-run single that put the Brewers ahead 4-3. The Milwaukee bullpen kept the Angels off the board in the final two innings, and the Brewers took home the franchise's first American League pennant.

1982 World Series 

Though the teams had never met, the cities had an existing commercial rivalry in the beer market, as St. Louis is the home of Anheuser Busch while Milwaukee is the home of Miller Brewing. This led to the Series being nicknamed the "Suds Series".

Paul Molitor set a World Series record with his fifth hit in the 9th inning of Game 1. Robin Yount would set another record in the 7th inning of Game 5 by becoming the first player in Series history to have two four-hit games in one Series.

Cardinals catcher Darrell Porter was given the Series MVP award. Brewers pitcher Mike Caldwell, who won two games, would have been a strong candidate, as well as Molitor. Paul Molitor would eventually win the Series MVP Award 11 years later as a member of the Toronto Blue Jays. As it was, the winning team won the MVP. The only player on the losing team to win the MVP was Bobby Richardson of the 1960 New York Yankees.

Both participants are currently in the NL Central, due to the transfer of the Brewers from the American League to the National League in 1998. This raises the possibility of the Brewers eventually playing a World Series in two different leagues.

Game 1 
October 12, 1982, at Busch Stadium in St. Louis, Missouri

Game 2 
October 13, 1982, at Busch Stadium in St. Louis, Missouri

Game 3 
October 15, 1982, at Milwaukee County Stadium in Milwaukee, Wisconsin

The Brewers bats were initially stymied by Cardinals starter Joaquín Andújar, while rookie Willie McGee shocked everyone with two home runs off Brewers ace Pete Vuckovich, helping give the Cardinals a 5-0 lead. In a scary moment, Andújar was knocked out of the game when Cecil Cooper hit a line drive that hit Andújar in the leg, though the injury turned out to not be very serious. With bullpen ace Bruce Sutter pitching in relief, the Brewers attempted a comeback in the 8th inning. With two out, Cecil Cooper hit a 2-run homer to put Milwaukee on the board. The Brewers then got two base-runners, with Gorman Thomas representing the tying run. Thomas hit a deep fly ball to right-center field, but McGee, becoming the star of the game, made a leaping grab to rob Thomas of a potential game-tying home run. The Cardinals scored an insurance run in the 9th, and Sutter closed out the Brewers for the 6-2 Cardinals win and giving St. Louis a 2-1 Series lead.

Game 4 
October 16, 1982, at Milwaukee County Stadium in Milwaukee, Wisconsin

The Cardinals pounced early on Brewers starter Moose Haas, scoring 3 runs in the second and had a 5-1 lead going into the seventh inning. From there, the Brewers bats suddenly came alive. Jim Gantner started the scoring with an RBI double. After a Paul Molitor walk, Robin Yount followed with a bases-loaded 2-run single to put the Brewers within 1 run. Cecil Cooper then scored Molitor with an infield hit to tie the game. 3 batters later, with two outs, Gorman Thomas hit a 2-run double to give the Brewers the lead. Bob McClure then finished the Cardinals off for the save, giving the Brewers a crucial Game 4 win, tying the Series 2-2.

Game 5 
October 17, 1982, at Milwaukee County Stadium in Milwaukee, Wisconsin

Game 6 
October 19, 1982, at Busch Stadium in St. Louis, Missouri

Game 7 
October 20, 1982, at Busch Stadium in St. Louis, Missouri

Joaquín Andújar and Pete Vuckovich opposed each other once again.  The game was scoreless until the bottom of the fourth when the Cardinals scored first on a Lonnie Smith RBI single. Ben Oglivie tied it for the Brew Crew in the fifth with a solo homer, and they took a 3-1 lead in the sixth when Jim Gantner scored on an error and Cecil Cooper hit a sacrifice fly.

But, in the bottom of the sixth, Vuckovich began to run into trouble. With one out, Ozzie Smith singled and Lonnie Smith doubled him to third.  Brewers manager Harvey Kuenn then pulled Vuckovich in favor of Bob McClure, who intentionally walked pinch-hitter Gene Tenace to load the bases. Keith Hernandez then tied the game with a two-run single. George Hendrick then gave the Cardinals the lead with an RBI single.

The Cardinals punctuated the scoring with two runs in the eighth on RBI singles by Series MVP Darrell Porter and Steve Braun. Andújar pitched seven strong innings and Bruce Sutter pitched the eighth and ninth for his second save.

Composite box 
1982 World Series (4-3): St. Louis Cardinals (N.L.) over Milwaukee Brewers (A.L.)
{| border=1 cellspacing=0 width=575 style="margin-left:3em;"
|- style="text-align:center; background-color:#e6e6e6;"
!align=left width=155|Team
!width=25|1
!width=25|2
!width=25|3
!width=25|4
!width=25|5
!width=25|6
!width=25|7
!width=25|8
!width=25|9
!width=25|R
!width=25|H
!width=25|E
|- style="text-align:center;"
|align=left|St. Louis Cardinals
|1||5||3
|4||5||12
|3||3||3
|39||67||7
|- style="text-align:center;"
|align=left|Milwaukee Brewers
|3||1||3
|1||5||4
|7||4||5
|33||64||11
|- style="text-align:left;"
|colspan=13|Total Attendance: 384,570   Average Attendance: 54,939
|- style="text-align:left;"
|colspan=13|Winning Player's Share:  – $43,280,   Losing Player's Share – $31,935 * Includes Playoffs and World Series
|}

 Awards and honors 
 Robin Yount, American League Most Valuable Player
 Cecil Cooper, Silver Slugger Award
 Pete Vuckovich, American League Cy Young Award
 Harvey Kuenn, Associated Press AL Manager of the Year

 League leaders 
 Paul Molitor – American League leader, At bats (666)
 Paul Molitor – American League leader. Runs (136)
 Robin Yount – American League leader, Hits (210)
 Robin Yount – American League leader, Doubles (46)
 Robin Yount – American League leader, Slugging Percentage (.578)
 Robin Yount – American League leader, Total Bases (367)
 Gorman Thomas – American League leader, Home Runs (39)*

*= Tied with Reggie Jackson

 All-Stars All-Star GameStartersRobin Yount, SS
Cecil Cooper, 1BReserves'Ben Oglivie, OF
Rollie Fingers, P

Farm system

The Brewers' farm system consisted of five minor league affiliates in 1982.

 Notes 

 References 
1982 Milwaukee Brewers at Baseball Reference1982 Milwaukee Brewers at Baseball Almanac''

Milwaukee Brewers seasons
Milwaukee Brewers season
American League East champion seasons
American League champion seasons
Mil